John Jay Jorgensen (December 28, 1921 – January 19, 1973) was an American professional basketball player.

A 6'2" guard/forward, Jorgensen played two seasons (1947–1949) in the Basketball Association of America as a member of the Chicago Stags, Baltimore Bullets, and Minneapolis Lakers.  He averaged 2.3 points per game in his BAA career and won a championship with the Lakers in 1949. He also played in the National Basketball League.

Jorgensen played on the freshman team of the DePaul Blue Demons during the 1941–42 season.

BAA career statistics

Regular season

Playoffs

References

External links

1921 births
1973 deaths
American men's basketball players
Basketball players from Chicago
Baltimore Bullets (1944–1954) players
Chicago Stags players
Forwards (basketball)
Guards (basketball)
Minneapolis Lakers players